Kasiguranin (Casiguranin) is a Tagalogic language that is indigenous to the Casiguran town of Aurora in the northern Philippines. It is descended from an early Tagalog dialect that had borrowed heavily from Northeastern Luzon Agta languages.

Dilasag, Dinapigue, Maconacon, and Divilacan are primarily Ilocano-speaking towns just to the north of Casiguran.

References

Tagalog dialects
Languages of Aurora (province)